Ashi Golan (also Romanized as Āshī Golān; also known as Ash Golān and Āsh Golān) is a village in Akhtachi Rural District, in the Central District of Bukan County, West Azerbaijan Province, Iran. At the 2006 census, its population was 135, in 19 families.

References 

Populated places in Bukan County